New Battles Without Honor and Humanity may refer to:

New Battles Without Honor and Humanity (1974 film), a Japanese film directed by Kinji Fukasaku
New Battles Without Honor and Humanity (2000 film), a Japanese film directed by Junji Sakamoto